CKEA-FM (95.7 MHz, 95.7 Cruz FM) is a radio station serving Edmonton, Alberta. Owned by Harvard Media, it broadcasts a rock-leaning classic hits format. CKEA's studios are located on Calgary Trail in Edmonton, while its transmitter is located at Ellerslie Road and Provincial Highway 21, just southeast of Edmonton city limits.

As of Feb 28, 2021, CKEA is the 11th-most-listened-to radio station in the Edmonton market according to a PPM data report released by Numeris.

History 
The station's license was approved by the CRTC in July 2009, and officially launched on September 6, 2010 as 95.7 The Sound, with an adult album alternative format. On March 25, 2011, at Noon, the station flipped to adult contemporary branded as Lite 95.7, launching with a weekend of Christmas music to promote that it would do so every holiday season afterwards under the format.

On December 27, 2013 at Noon the station flipped to a rock-leaning adult hits format as 95.7 Cruz FM, joining an increasing number of Harvard stations across Canada in doing so. The station's branding and format is modelled upon sister station CFWD-FM in Saskatoon, which adopted it the previous year. The first songs as Cruz were a double-side play of "We Will Rock You" and "We Are The Champions", both by Queen.

References

External links
 
 

Kea
Kea
Kea
Radio stations established in 2010
2010 establishments in Alberta